Fugitive dust is an environmental air quality term for very small particles suspended in the air, primarily mineral dust that is sourced from the soil of Earth's pedosphere. A significant volume of fugitive dust that is visible from a distance is known as a dust cloud, and a large dust cloud driven by a gust front is known as a dust storm.

Fugitive dust particles are mainly minerals common to soil, including silicon oxides, aluminium oxides, calcium carbonates and iron oxides. About half of fugitive dust particles are larger than 10 microns in diameter and settle more quickly than the smaller particles. It does not include particulate matter from other common artificial sources such as vehicle exhaust, burn piles or smokestacks. The term is used to denote that the dust "escapes" into the atmosphere rather than being exhausted in a "confined flow stream" from a "ducted emitter" (an exhaust pipe or chimney).

The U.S. Environmental Protection Agency estimated that fugitive dust was responsible for 92% of the PM-10 emissions in the United States in 1995.

Sources

Fugitive dust results from dry conditions where there is insufficient moisture content in the ground to maintain adhesion and hold the soil together. Particulate matter (PM) then enters the atmosphere through the action of wind, vehicular movement, or other activities.

Areas with dryland or desert climates, especially when combined with high winds, have more severe problems of fugitive dust. Dry and disturbed surfaces can release wind-borne fugitive dust for many months before there is sufficient rainfall to coagulate the soil, this includes the dust Bulldust. Large-scale fugitive dust driven by gust fronts creates a dust storm.

Surfaces susceptible to fugitive dust emissions are both natural and man-made.  Specific sources include open fields and parking lots, paved and unpaved roads, agricultural fields, construction sites, unenclosed storage piles, and material transfer systems.. Surface mining operations are also sources of fugitive dust as a result of many mining operations including haul roads, tailing piles, drilling, blasting, the removal of overburden and the actual mineral extraction.

In 1995, 28 percent of fugitive dust in the US originated from unpaved roads, 23 percent from construction sites, 19 percent agricultural, 15 percent from paved roads, 5 percent from wind erosion, 1 percent from mining according to the EPA.

Effects
The inhalation of PM by people introduces it into the lungs where it can cause respiratory illnesses, permanent lung damage, and in some individuals premature death. PM with diameters of ≤10 micrometers (PM10) can harm human health, with particles of ≤2.5 micrometers (PM2.5) being the worst.

As wind-borne dust can easily migrate, respiratory irritation can occur in construction and agricultural workers close to a source as well as others including wildlife. In addition to adverse health affects, the abrasive nature of particulate matter can cause property damage and obscure visibility leading to vehicular collisions causing injury and death.

Fugitive dust can also harm plant life. In 1999, the National Park Service found that lichen and other non-vascular plants in the Cape Krusenstern National Monument in Alaska were affected due to dust generated from hauling ore from the Red Dog mine along a  road within the monument. A follow-up study in 2006 found slightly elevated levels of lead and cadmium concentrations in small birds and voles captured along the road.

A lawsuit in 2011 filed by 150 Waimea, Hawaii residents alleges that their homes were subjected, "on almost a daily basis", to blown "pesticide-laden fugitive dust". The residents claimed their homes sustained physical damage and they were forced to live with their windows closed year-round. They were seeking monetary damages from DuPont Pioneer to compensate for the reduced value of their homes and suggested future lawsuits would address health issues.

A 2017 lawsuit in Maryland claims that fugitive dust from a -high pile of coal dust at a coal processing plant has caused "extensive damage" through erosion to blades on wind turbines in a nearby wind farm.

Measurement
One of the first methods of measuring fugitive dust was developed in the 1970s and used isokinetic dust samplers. At least six samplers were needed downstream of a dust source. Exposure profiling was developed later and used in the 1980s and 1990s. Later improvements use time-resolved dust monitors to  isolate short-term dust releases. New methods include Optical Remote Sensing which uses an open path laser transmissometer used with time-resolved dust monitors and other wind monitors.

Prevention
Various methods are employed to minimize fugitive dust. In agricultural settings, bare soil can be covered with crop residue or planted with cover crops between seasons. Dirt roads can be sprayed with water to contain dust, or stabilized with chemicals that form hard surface crusts, or paved with aggregate or a hard surface. In windy areas, wind barriers including fences or vegetation can reduce wind speed and trap larger particles already in the air. Irrigation can be used to keep soil moist between natural rainfalls.

Fugitive dust can be controlled by the application of various chemical suppressants including lignin sulfonates, petroleum resins, latexes, salts, plastics, and wetting agents.

Coal dust piles have been treated with water or other chemical surfactants to suppress dust until the moisture evaporates. Other chemicals can provide protection for up to six months. Wind fences of polyester fabric can also be used to slow wind movement and minimize fugitive dust.

Regulation
The US state of Arizona has an Agricultural Dust Program with compliance officers that inspect agricultural operations and investigate dust complaints. All farms in the state must take "reasonable precautions" to "minimize" the emission of fugitive dust. More stringent procedures must be followed in areas that don't meet Federal air quality standards.

The US Federal Environmental Protection Agency has specific standards for daily average particulate matter originating from active mines.

Other types
Dust emitted from processing equipment that may not contain typical soil components is also considered fugitive dust. In this context, fugitive dust is dust that has "escaped" during any mechanical process and entered the atmosphere. Fugitive dust emissions within a structure can not only cause respiratory problems but, when generated during the processing of combustible materials, can cause fire and blast damage if ignited.

Fugitive dust acquires an electrostatic charge when dispersed in the air. Spraying an oppositely charged water fog can be used to effectively control dust in an industrial setting. If so charged, less water is needed to cause the particulate matter to drop from the air. This method has been tested with many materials including silica flour, sulfur dioxide, and fly ash.

See also
Asian dust
Bull dust
Coal dust
Occupational dust exposure

References

Further reading
PM 10 and Fugitive Dust in the Southwest Ambient Impact, Sources and Remedies, US Environmental Protection Agency 
Fugitive Dust Control Technology Issue 96 of Pollution technology review 

Air pollution emissions
Environmental law in the United States
Dust